Francis Weston Sears (October 1, 1898 – November 12, 1975) was an American physicist. He was a professor of physics at MIT for 35 years before moving to Dartmouth College in 1956. At Dartmouth, Sears was the Appleton Professor of Physics. He is best known for co-authoring University Physics, an introductory physics textbook, with Mark Zemansky. The book, first published in 1949, is often referred to as "Sears and Zemansky", although Hugh Young became a coauthor in 1973.

In 1932 he collaborated with Peter Debye in the discovery of what is now called the Debye–Sears effect, the diffraction of light by ultrasonic waves.

Sears was a fellow of the Optical Society of America, and was active in the American Association of Physics Teachers, serving as its treasurer from 1950 to 1958, followed by successive one-year terms as president-elect and president. He retired to Norwich, Vermont and died in Hanover, New Hampshire, of a stroke on November 12, 1975.

Awards
 1961 — Oersted Medal of the American Association of Physics Teachers

Books
 
 Sears, Francis W. (1946). Electricity and Magnetism. Reading, Massachusetts. Addison-Wesley
 
  2nd edition, 1953
 Sears, Francis W. (1950). Mechanics, heat and sound. Cambridge, Massachusetts. Addison Wesley.

See also

 MIT Physics Department

References

1898 births
1975 deaths
20th-century American physicists
American textbook writers
American male non-fiction writers
Massachusetts Institute of Technology alumni
Massachusetts Institute of Technology School of Science faculty
Fellows of Optica (society)
20th-century American male writers
Dartmouth College faculty
Scientists from Massachusetts
People from Plymouth, Massachusetts